Dervishi is a modern Albanian surname of Persian origin from "darvish (درویش, Darvīsh or "Darwish" in Arabic), that entered Albanian from the Turkish adaption "Derviş" (Dervish). Notable people with the surname include:
Erald Dervishi (born 1979), Albanian chess grandmaster
Qazim Dervishi (1908–1994), Albanian soccer player and international referee 
Teki Dervishi (born 1943), ethnic-Albanian poet, novelist and playwright

Albanian-language surnames